Michael John Tierney  (born 18 January 1977), is a member of Australian band Human Nature and younger brother of fellow member Andrew Tierney.

Mike Tierney grew up in Sydney, New South Wales, with older brother Andrew Tierney, and studied at Hurlstone Agricultural High School, where they met Toby Allen and Phil Burton, and formed a group called the 4Trax; they performed for the first time in 1989 at a Combined Schools Concert singing "Earth Angel".

Tierney is married to Andrea (née Pope) who is the younger sister of Heather Tierney (née Pope, Andrew's wife). They announced the birth of a daughter in 2010 in Nevada.

References

General
  Note: Archived [on-line] copy has limited functionality.
  Note: [on-line] version established at White Room Electronic Publishing Pty Ltd in 2007 and was expanded from the 2002 edition.
http://au.lifestyle.yahoo.com/new-idea/news/magazine/article/-/7973892/human-nature-s-michael-meet-my-baby-girl/

Specific

External links
 Human Nature official website

1977 births
Living people
Australian people of Irish descent
Australian pop singers
Human Nature (band) members
Musicians from Sydney
21st-century Australian singers
Recipients of the Medal of the Order of Australia
21st-century Australian male singers